The 1989 Greenlandic Men's Football Championship was the 19th edition of the Greenlandic Men's Football Championship. The final round was held in Qaqortoq. It was won by Kagssagssuk Maniitsoq for the first time in its history.

Qualifying stage

North Greenland
All matches were played in Uummannaq.

Disko Bay
All matches were played in Qasigiannguit.

Central Greenland
All matches were played in Sisimiut.

South Greenland
All matches were played in Narsaq.

NB Kissaviarsuk-33 qualified for the final Round as hosts.

Final round

Pool 1

Pool 2

Playoffs

Semi-finals

Seventh-place match

Fifth-place match

Third-place match

Final

See also
Football in Greenland
Football Association of Greenland
Greenland national football team
Greenlandic Men's Football Championship

References

Greenlandic Men's Football Championship seasons
Green
Green
Foot